The Dallas Lightning were a U.S. soccer club that competed in the USISL from 1993 to 1996 and the USISL W-League from 1995 to 1997. The men's team folded after the 1995–96 USISL indoor season and the women's team folded after the 1997 USISL W-League season.

Based in Tyler, Texas, the club originally started as the Texas Umeme Lightning. The team quickly changed its name to the Tyler Lightning and became the Texas Lightning upon their move to Dallas, Texas for the 1993/94 indoor season. They were renamed the Dallas Lightning for the 1995/96 indoor season.

Year-by-year

References

Sports in the Dallas–Fort Worth metroplex
Defunct soccer clubs in Texas
Lightning
USISL teams
Defunct indoor soccer clubs in the United States
1996 disestablishments in Texas
1993 establishments in Texas
Soccer clubs in Texas
Association football clubs established in 1993
Association football clubs disestablished in 1996
Sports in Tyler, Texas